Mastax latefasciata is a species of beetle in the family Carabidae found in China and Vietnam.

References

Mastax latefasciata
Beetles of Asia
Beetles described in 1931